XHSDD-TDT is a television station broadcasting on virtual channel 15 in Sabinas, Coahuila, Mexico. It is a local station carrying some programs from Multimedios Televisión.

History
XHSDD began as channel 59, put out for bid in the 1990s and won by Televisora Alco, S.A. de C.V. The station moved to channel 5 before signing on July 24, 2000. XHSDD was sold to Melchor Sánchez Dovalina, an operator of radio stations in Monclova, in 2001, and to Telesistemas de Coahuila in 2006.

XHSDD shut off its analog signal on December 16, 2015, along with other stations in northern Coahuila. It relocated from virtual channel 5 to 15 in October 2016 in order to clear channel 5 for the Canal 5 network.

XHSDD has one digital shadow channel, serving Allende and broadcasting with 250 watts.

Subchannels
XHSDD carries a two-hour timeshift of the main 15.1 channel as subchannel 15.2. A previous third subchannel, "Mix TV", was closed in 2021.

References

Spanish-language television stations in Mexico
Television stations in Coahuila
Television channels and stations established in 2000
2000 establishments in Mexico